Johannes Kotschy is a Swedish singer and songwriter who rose to fame after winning the third season of the Swedish reality show Popstars on Kanal5.  An early favorite, he won the show convincingly.

Johannes has had several hit singles and presented awards at the NRJ Awards in Stockholm 2004.

External links
Article on Johannes (Swedish)

Popstars winners
Swedish male singers
Living people
Year of birth missing (living people)
Place of birth missing (living people)